The Town Shifts; Or, The Suburb-Justice is a 1671 comedy play by Edward Revet. It was originally staged by the Duke's Company at the Lincoln's Inn Fields Theatre in London. It is part of the tradition of Restoration Comedy.

The original cast included Philip Cademan as Lovewell, Matthew Medbourne as Friendly, Edward Angel as Leftwell, Henry Norris as Pett, Samuel Sandford as  Frump, Joseph Williams as Moses, Mary Lee as Leticia, Elinor Leigh as Betty and Jane Long as Fickle.

References

Bibliography
 Canfield, J. Douglas. Tricksters and Estates: On the Ideology of Restoration Comedy. University Press of Kentucky, 2014.
 Van Lennep, W. The London Stage, 1660-1800: Volume One, 1660-1700. Southern Illinois University Press, 1960.

1671 plays
West End plays
Restoration comedy
Plays set in London